Dzmitry Yuzvovich (born 25 January 1989) is a Belarusian former professional footballer.

External links
 
 

1989 births
Living people
Belarusian footballers
FC Neman Grodno players
FC Partizan Minsk players
FC Smorgon players
FC Baranovichi players
FC PMC Postavy players
FC Slonim-2017 players
FC Smolevichi players
Association football forwards
People from Slonim
Sportspeople from Grodno Region